Joseph Johnson was an English professional footballer who played as a full-back for Sunderland.

References

Footballers from Tyne and Wear
English footballers
Association football fullbacks
Sunderland A.F.C. players
Ebbw Vale F.C. players
English Football League players